Christine Campbell (born March 19, 1964) is an American rower. She competed in the women's eight event at the 1988 Summer Olympics.

References

External links
 

1964 births
Living people
American female rowers
Olympic rowers of the United States
Rowers at the 1988 Summer Olympics
Sportspeople from Chicago
21st-century American women